Secondary Highway 525, commonly referred to as Highway 525, is a provincially maintained secondary highway in the Canadian province of Ontario. It is a short, remote secondary highway that links Highway 596 to the Wabaseemoong First Nations reserve. It is the second-westernmost secondary highway in the province, Highway 673 being the first. The route was commissioned by 1982 along what was formerly Highway 596; a former use of the route number existed between 1956 and 1973 in Gravenhurst.

Route description 
Highway 525 is a very remote highway in northwestern Ontario. There are no settlements along its  length, and the closest human habitation is Minaki near its southern terminus and Whitedog near its northern terminus. The route begins west of Minaki, branching off from Highway 596, which travels south to Kenora. It travels north along a wide strip of land bounded by Sand Lake to the east, and by Swan Lake and Tetu Lake to the west, all part of the Winnipeg River watershed. Zig-zagging in a generally northward direction, the highway passes through thick boreal forest. At approximately its midpoint, the route meets the Cygnet Lake road, which provides access to a remote camp. The highway continues north, curving west immediately before ending at the entrance to the Wabaseemoong (Islington) reserve. The road continues into the reserve to provide access to Caribou Falls and Whitedog.

History 
The current Highway 525 is not the original usage of the number. In 1956, the number was one of several dozen Secondary Highways designated by the Department of Highways to improve connections between King's Highways.
The highway followed the route of present-day Muskoka District Road 18 north from Highway 11 to the Muskoka Centre.
It was decommissioned between early 1972 and late 1973, shortly after the establishment of the District Municipality of Muskoka.

The current Highway 525 was designated by 1982.
Prior to that, the road it followed was an extension of Highway 596 that was designated in the mid-1970s.
The route was gravel surfaced when it was assumed, but has since been paved.

Major intersections

References 

525